In mathematics, the Hahn decomposition theorem, named after the Austrian mathematician Hans Hahn, states that for any measurable space  and any signed measure  defined on the -algebra , there exist two -measurable sets,  and , of  such that:

The pair  is then called a Hahn decomposition of the signed measure .

Jordan measure decomposition 

The two measures can be defined as

Note that the Jordan decomposition is unique, while the Hahn decomposition is only essentially unique.

The Jordan decomposition has the following corollary: Given a Jordan decomposition  of a finite signed measure , one has

The last expression means that the Jordan decomposition is the minimal decomposition of  into a difference of non-negative measures. This is the minimality property of the Jordan decomposition.

Proof of the Jordan decomposition: For an elementary proof of the existence, uniqueness, and minimality of the Jordan measure decomposition see Fischer (2012).

Proof of the Hahn decomposition theorem 

Preparation: Assume that  does not take the value  (otherwise decompose according to ). As mentioned above, a negative set is a set  such that  for every -measurable subset .

Claim: Suppose that  satisfies . Then there is a negative set  such that .

Proof of the claim: Define . Inductively assume for  that  has been constructed. Let

This supremum might a priori be infinite.

Set  to finish the induction step. Finally, define

This shows that . Assume  were not a negative set. This means that there would exist a -measurable subset  that satisfies . Therefore,  must be a negative set.

Construction of the decomposition: Set . Inductively, given , define

This infimum might a priori be . Hence, there exists a -measurable subset  such that

By the claim above, there is a negative set  such that . Set  to finish the induction step. Finally, define

As the sets  are disjoint, we have for every -measurable subset  that

In particular, this shows that  is a negative set. Next, define . Then  for all  and

Therefore,  is a positive set.

Proof of the uniqueness statement:
Then   is a positive set and also a negative set. Therefore, every measurable subset of it has measure zero. As

this completes the proof. Q.E.D.

References

External links
 Hahn decomposition theorem at PlanetMath.
 
 Jordan decomposition of a signed measure at Encyclopedia of Mathematics

Theorems in measure theory
Articles containing proofs